Daniel Rankine (born 24 May 1983), known professionally as Trials, is an Indigenous Australian rapper, songwriter, and record producer hailing from Adelaide, South Australia. In 2020, he signed to Island Records Australia and Universal Music Australia to release his debut solo album.

Trials' work includes collaborations, co-writes and production of tracks with a range of artists and genres including Drapht, Gurrumul, Archie Roach, Hilltop Hoods, Pete Murray, Seth Sentry, Illy, DZ Deathrays, Paul Kelly, Thelma Plum, Mo’Ju and Dune Rats.

He is a member of Funkoars and A.B. Original.

Discography

Albums

See also
 A.B. Original
 Funkoars

Awards and nominations

APRA Music Awards
The APRA Awards are presented annually from 1982 by the Australasian Performing Right Association (APRA), "honouring composers and songwriters".

! 
|-
| APRA Music Awards of 2018
| Adam Briggs / Daniel Rankine
| Songwriter of the Year
| 
| 
|-
| APRA Music Awards of 2019
| "Blaccout" (Adam Briggs / Daniel Rankine)
| Song of the Year
| 
| 
|-

ARIA Music Awards
The ARIA Music Awards is an annual awards ceremony that recognises excellence, innovation, and achievement across all genres of Australian music. They commenced in 1987. 

! 
|-
| 2019
| Cargo
| Best Original Soundtrack, Cast or Show Album
| 
| 
|-

References

1983 births
A.B. Original members
Australian male rappers
Australian record producers
Indigenous Australian musicians
Living people